The unitary authorities of England are those local authorities which are responsible for the provision of all local government services within a district. They are constituted under the Local Government Act 1992, which amended the Local Government Act 1972 to allow the existence of counties that do not have multiple districts. They typically allow large towns to have separate local authorities from the less urbanised parts of their counties and originally provided a single authority for small counties where division into districts would be impractical. However, the UK government has more recently proposed the formation of much larger unitary authorities, including a single authority for North Yorkshire, the largest non-metropolitan county in England, at present divided into seven districts.

Unitary authorities do not cover all of England. Most were established during the 1990s, though further tranches were created in 2009 and 2019–21. Unitary authorities have the powers and functions that are elsewhere separately administered by councils of non-metropolitan counties and the non-metropolitan districts within them.

History

Background
The term "unitary authority" was first used in the Redcliffe-Maud Report in 1969 in its current sense of a local government authority which combines the functions of a county council and a district council. Strictly speaking, the term does not necessarily mean a single level of local government within an area, because in some cases there are also parish councils in the same area.

Although the term was not applied to them, county boroughs between 1889 and 1974 were effectively unitary authorities, that is, single-tier administrative units.  Before 1889, local government authorities had different powers and functions, but from medieval times some cities and towns had a high degree of autonomy as counties corporate. Some smaller settlements also enjoyed some degree of autonomy from regular administration as boroughs or liberties.

The Local Government Act 1972 created areas for local government where large towns and their rural hinterlands were administered together. The concept of unitary units was abandoned with a two-tier arrangement of county and district councils in all areas of England, except the Isles of Scilly where the small size and distance from the mainland made it impractical. In 1986 a broadly unitary system of local government was introduced in the six metropolitan counties and Greater London, where the upper-tier authorities were abolished and their functions were split between central government, the borough councils and joint boards.

1990s reform

A review in the 1990s was initiated to select non-metropolitan areas where new unitary authorities could be created. The resulting structural changes were implemented between 1995 and 1998. Bristol, Herefordshire, the Isle of Wight and Rutland were established as counties of a single district; the district councils of Berkshire became unitary; the counties of Avon, Humberside and Cleveland were broken up to create several unitary authorities; and a number of districts were split off from their associated counties. The changes caused the ceremonial counties to be defined separately, as they had been before 1974. The review caused 46 unitary authorities to be created.

2009 changes

A further review was initiated in 2007 and was enacted in 2009. The review established Cornwall and Northumberland as counties of a single district; established unitary authorities in County Durham, Shropshire and Wiltshire covering the part of the county that was not already split off in the 1990s review; and divided the remainder of Bedfordshire and Cheshire into two unitary authorities. The review caused nine unitary authorities to be created.

Further reform

In 2016, Oxfordshire County Council put forward a 'One Oxfordshire' proposal which would see Oxford City Council and the four other district councils in Oxfordshire abolished and replaced with a single unitary county council for Oxfordshire. In 2017, Oxford City Council voiced their opposition to the proposal. A decision on whether the proposal will go ahead was to have been announced in March 2017.

In 2017, it was proposed that two unitary authorities be formed to cover the ceremonial county of Dorset. One of the authorities would consist of the existing unitary authorities of Bournemouth, Poole and the non-metropolitan district of Christchurch, the other would be composed of the remainder of the county. In November 2017, Secretary of State for Communities and Local Government, Sajid Javid stated that he was "minded to approve the proposals" and a final decision to implement the two unitary authority model was confirmed in February 2018. Statutory instruments for the creation of two unitary authorities, to be named Bournemouth, Christchurch and Poole Council and Dorset Council, have been made and shadow authorities for the new council areas were formed ahead of their creation on 1 April 2019.

Buckinghamshire County Council and the non-metropolitan districts of Aylesbury Vale, Chiltern, South Bucks, and Wycombe in Buckinghamshire were replaced by a single unitary authority known as Buckinghamshire Council on 1 April 2020. The existing unitary authority of Milton Keynes was not affected; from 1 April 2020, therefore, the ceremonial county of Buckinghamshire has been composed of two unitary authorities.

In March 2018, an independent report commissioned by the Secretary of State for Housing, Communities and Local Government, proposed structural changes to local government in Northamptonshire. These changes would see the existing county council and district councils abolished and two new unitary authorities created in their place. One authority, West Northamptonshire, would consist of the existing districts of Daventry, Northampton and South Northamptonshire and the other authority, North Northamptonshire would consist of Corby, East Northamptonshire, Kettering and Wellingborough districts. This was confirmed in May 2019, with the new councils being created in April 2021.

In July 2021 the Ministry of Housing, Communities and Local Government announced that in April 2023, the non-metropolitan counties of Cumbria, North Yorkshire and Somerset will be reorganised into unitary authorities. The new authorities, Cumberland, Westmorland and Furness, North Yorkshire Council and Somerset Council were first elected in May 2022 and will formally assume their powers on 1 April 2023.

Restructuring
The process of changing from a two-tier local government to a structure based on unitary authorities is called 'restructuring'. The Secretary of State responsible for local government invites proposals from local areas to restructure into unitary authorities, and the Secretary decides whether or not the change should be implemented. The restructuring is carried out by an Order. There are no examples in the UK of councils restructuring back into a two-tier system.

Functions
Unitary authorities combine the powers and functions that are normally delivered separately by the councils of non-metropolitan counties and non-metropolitan districts. These functions are housing, waste management, waste collection, council tax collection, education, libraries, social services, transport, planning, consumer protection, licensing, cemeteries and crematoria. The breakdown of these services is as follows:

Criticism
Unitary government has been criticised for damaging local democracy. Opponents to unitary authority criticise the 'bigger is better' assumption and highlight that larger councils breed mistrust of councillors and reduction in public engagement and voter turnout. Outside the UK, multi-level local government is the prevailing system, with major towns normally having a local authority. The average size of a local authority in England is 170,000, three times that of Europe.

Electoral arrangements
Most unitary authorities are divided into a number of multiple member wards from which councillors are elected in the same way as in two-tier district council elections. The exceptions, which are divided into electoral divisions as in county council elections, are Cornwall, County Durham, the Isle of Wight, Northumberland, Shropshire and Wiltshire.

Current list
Districts are usually named after a town, city, geographical area or county (historic and or ceremonial). With no effect on powers or functions, districts can have the status of royal borough, borough or city. A district having a charter is dependent on the charter's wording: as a charter trustee to a place in the district; having joint charter to the place and district or to the district itself.

Notes

Future unitary authorities 
Four new unitary authorities will come into operation in 2023:

Former unitary authorities

Similar authorities
The Council of the Isles of Scilly is a sui generis single-tier authority, created in 1890 and since 1930 has held the "powers, duties and liabilities" of a county council. It thus is not a unitary authority as those are such authorities created under the Local Government Act 1992. The 36 metropolitan borough councils are also the sole elected local government units in their areas (except for parish councils in a few locations), but share strategic functions with joint boards and arrangements. On the other hand, the City of London Corporation and the 32 London borough councils, although they have a high degree of autonomy, share strategic functions with the directly elected Mayor of London and London Assembly.

Combined authorities
Unitary authorities should not be confused with another formation in English local government, the combined authority.

See also
 Local government in England
 History of local government in England
 List of unitary authorities of England by population
 List of county councils in England
 Political make-up of unitary authorities in England

References

 
Local government in England
England geography-related lists